Passaic Elks Club is located in Passaic, Passaic County, New Jersey, United States. The building was built in the Italian Renaissance Revival style in 1924.

The Elks Club structure was added to the National Register of Historic Places on December 28, 2005.

See also
National Register of Historic Places listings in Passaic County, New Jersey

References

Buildings and structures in Passaic, New Jersey
Elks buildings
Clubhouses on the National Register of Historic Places in New Jersey
Buildings and structures completed in 1924
Renaissance Revival architecture in New Jersey
Italian Renaissance Revival architecture in the United States
Clubhouses in New Jersey
National Register of Historic Places in Passaic County, New Jersey
New Jersey Register of Historic Places